The 2020–21 Mississippi State Bulldogs women's basketball team represented Mississippi State University during the 2020–21 NCAA Division I women's basketball season. The Bulldogs, led by first-year head coach Nikki McCray-Penson, played their home games at Humphrey Coliseum and competed as members of the Southeastern Conference (SEC).

Previous season
The Bulldogs finished the season with a 27–6 overall record and a 13–3 record in conference play. The Bulldogs lost to South Carolina in the Championship of the SEC tournament. Head coach Vic Schaefer resigned following the season to become head coach at Texas. Old Dominion head coach Nikki McCray-Penson was hired to replace him.

Offseason

Departures

2020 recruiting class

Incoming transfers

Preseason

SEC media poll
The SEC media poll was released on November 17, 2020 with the Bulldogs selected to finish in fifth place in the SEC.

Preseason All-SEC teams
The Bulldogs had two players selected to the preseason all-SEC teams.

First team

Rickea Jackson

Second team

Jessika Carter

Roster

Schedule

|-
!colspan=9 style=| Non-conference regular season

|-
!colspan=9 style=| SEC regular season

|-
!colspan=9 style=| SEC Tournament

See also
2020–21 Mississippi State Bulldogs men's basketball team

References

Mississippi State Bulldogs women's basketball seasons
Mississippi State
Mississippi State Bulldogs
Mississippi State Bulldogs